Haworthia angustifolia is a species of Haworthia from the eastern Cape Province. It is an evergreen succulent plant with short leaves arranged in rosettes of 8 cm in diameter. The leaves, about 20, are upright, acuminate and lanceolate, 3–6 cm long and 6–12 mm wide.

References

angustifolia
Flora of the Cape Provinces